Kathryn Ann Hardegen (born 1983) is an Australian chess player who holds the FIDE title of Woman FIDE Master (WFM, 2017).

Biography
Kathryn Hardegen was born in the Philippines 1983. In 2009, she married leading Western Australian chess player Andrew Hardegen. They have one daughter, Zoe (born 2016).

Chess career
Hardegen learned chess as a child. As a teenager she played board 4 for the Philippines Women's team at the 35th Chess Olympiad in Bled, 2002. In 2003, she won the Philippine Girls' Championship, so earned the right to represent Philippines in the Asian Junior Championships in Sri Lanka later that year, where she met her future husband. Still later that year, she played for the Philippines in the South East Asian Games in Hanoi.

After a number of years away from chess, Hardegen and her husband returned to the game in 2014. In 2017, in Auckland Hardegen won second place in Women's World Chess Championship Oceania Zonal 3.6 tournament. This result qualified Hardegen for the Woman FIDE Master (WFM) title. She was the only player to defeat the winner, Layla Timergazi.

After Timergazi withdrew from her qualification spot, Hardegen replaced her for the Women's World Chess Championship 2018 in Khanty Mansiysk. In the first round of this knockout format, she was eliminated by the reigning Women's World Champion Ju Wenjun.

References

External links
 
 

1983 births
Living people
Australian female chess players
Chess Woman FIDE Masters